
Gmina Kochanowice is a rural gmina (administrative district) in Lubliniec County, Silesian Voivodeship, in southern Poland.

The gmina contains part of the protected area called Upper Liswarta Forests Landscape Park.

Villages
Gmina Kochanowice contains the villages and settlements of Droniowice, Harbułtowice, Jawornica, Kochanowice, Kochcice, Lubecko, Lubockie, Ostrów, Pawełki, Swaciok and Szklarnia.

Neighbouring gminas
Gmina Kochanowice is bordered by the town of Lubliniec and by the gminas of Ciasna, Herby, Koszęcin and Pawonków.

Twin towns – sister cities

Gmina Kochanowice is twinned with:
 Schöllkrippen, Germany

References

Kochanowice
Lubliniec County